The Asian monitor lizard tick, (Amblyomma varanense) is a hard-bodied tick of the genus Amblyomma. It is found in India, Thailand, Taiwan and Sri Lanka. Adults parasitize various reptiles such as varanids and snakes. These ticks are potential vectors of spotted fever group (SFG) rickettsiae.

References

External links
Asian monitor lizard tick - Amblyomma varanense Supino, 1897
Borrelia sp. phylogenetically different from Lyme disease- and relapsing fever-related Borrelia spp. in Amblyomma varanense from Python reticulatus
[263930612_Molecular_detection_of_Rickettsia_species_in_Amblyomma_ticks_collected_from_snakes_in_Thailand Molecular detection of Rickettsia species in Amblyomma ticks collected from snakes in Thailand]
The description of the larva of Amblyomma romitii
Molecular evidence of potential novel spotted fever group rickettsiae, Anaplasma and Ehrlichia species in Amblyomma ticks parasitizing wild snakes

Amblyomma
Animals described in 1897